The Third Billion is the term used to represent the approximately one billion women in both developing and industrialized nations whose economic lives have previously been stunted, underleveraged, or suppressed, and who could, over the next decade, take their place in the global economy as consumers, producers, employees and entrepreneurs.

Overview of The Third Billion Concept
Approximately 870 million women who have been living or contributing at a subsistence level will enter the economic mainstream for the first time as producers, consumers, employees, and entrepreneurs by 2020. In the following decade, this number could conceivably pass 1 billion. The economic impact of these women is expected to be at least as significant as that of the populations of China and India that exceed one billion.
The term, the “third billion” was coined by Booz & Company partners DeAnne Aguirre and Karim Sabbagh from their analysis of this emerging population published in May 2010.

The Third Billion Campaign
On February 1, 2012, The Third Billion campaign was launched by La Pietra Coalition. The Third Billion campaign aims to unite governments, NGOs, corporations, youth and others to provide these women with the necessary tools—ensuring access to legal protection, education and training, finance, and markets—to reach their full economic potential. The campaign aims to help prepare and enable women who constitute The Third Billion, who have the potential, yet lack the resources, to compete in the global economy.

The Third Billion Index
Booz & Company published the inaugural Third Billion Index in 2012 to provide a baseline for women's progress in the workforce. The index is a composite of data published by the World Economic Forum and the Economist Intelligence Unit. The index includes profiles of countries around the world to offer in-depth analysis of the barriers women in these countries face as they attempt to achieve their full economic potential as well as the role of governments and companies in boosting women's participation and advancement in the workforce and advancing female entrepreneurship.

References

External links
 The Third Billion Concept official website

Women's rights
Women's rights organizations
Women's studies